Barber's itch may refer to:

 Pseudofolliculitis barbae
 Sycosis vulgaris
 Tinea barbae

Bacterium-related cutaneous conditions
Mycosis-related cutaneous conditions